Rosenvinge is a surname, and may refer to:

 Rosenvinge (noble family), a Danish and Norwegian noble family since 1505

 Carina Rosenvinge Christiansen (born 1991), Danish archer
 Christina Rosenvinge (born 1964), Spanish singer-songwriter
 Janus Lauritz Andreas Kolderup-Rosenvinge (1792 – 1850), Danish jurist 
 Lauritz Kolderup Rosenvinge (1858–1939), Danish botanist and phycologist
 Mette Rosenvinge (born 1942), Norwegian speed skater